The Big Store is a 1973 French comedy film directed by Claude Zidi.

Plot
Four friends (Les Charlots) are fired from work due to their incompetence. They then decide to help a small shopkeeper who is struggling to compete with a large store nearby.

Cast
 Gérard Rinaldi - Gérard 
 Jean Sarrus - Jean 
 Gérard Filipelli - Phil 
 Jean-Guy Fechner - Jean-Guy 
 Michel Galabru - Émile 
 Michel Serrault - Félix Boucan 
 Jacques Seiler - Jacques
 Coluche - The visitor to the apartment

References

External links
 
 
 

1973 comedy films
1973 films
Films directed by Claude Zidi
French comedy films
1970s French films